Rogersville is an unincorporated community located in the town of Lamartine, Fond du Lac County, Wisconsin, United States.

Images

References

Unincorporated communities in Fond du Lac County, Wisconsin
Unincorporated communities in Wisconsin